Paragus tibialis, is a species of hoverfly found in many parts of Europe and North Africa. It has a preference for drier areas and its larvae feed on root aphids.

External links
Images representing Paragus tibialis

References

Diptera of Europe
Syrphinae
Insects described in 1817